Vincent Han-Sun Chiang (born 26 March 1950) is a Taiwanese  physician,  medical professor and the president of Fu Jen Catholic University. He was also the president of the Association of Christian Universities and Colleges in Asia (ACUCA) during 2012 to 2014.

He graduated from the National Taiwan University (NTU). He obtained a doctoral degree at the Technische Universität München (Doktors der Medizin). At present, he serves in Fu Jen, NTU and Taipei Medical University.

References

External links
 Professor Dr. Han-Sun Chiang President

1950 births
Academic staff of Fu Jen Catholic University
National Taiwan University alumni
Presidents of universities and colleges in Taiwan
Taiwanese educators
Living people